André Niederlender (1890–1959) was a French archaeologist.

1890 births
1959 deaths
French archaeologists
20th-century archaeologists